Nokia 1661 is a mobile phone from Nokia part of the Ultrabasic family. which was released in Q2 2009.

See also 
 List of Nokia products

References 

Asha 205
Mobile phones introduced in 2009
Mobile phones with user-replaceable battery